Takuya Kuwabara     is a Japanese mixed martial artist. He competed in the Lightweight division.

Mixed martial arts record

|-
| Loss
| align=center| 8-3-4
| Rumina Sato
| Technical Decision (unanimous)
| Shooto - R.E.A.D. 9
| 
| align=center| 2
| align=center| 5:00
| Yokohama, Kanagawa, Japan
| 
|-
| Draw
| align=center| 8-2-4
| Ian James Schaffa
| Draw
| Shooto - R.E.A.D. 5
| 
| align=center| 3
| align=center| 5:00
| 
| 
|-
| Win
| align=center| 8-2-3
| Johnny Eduardo
| Decision (unanimous)
| Shooto - R.E.A.D. 2
| 
| align=center| 3
| align=center| 5:00
| Tokyo, Japan
| 
|-
| Loss
| align=center| 7-2-3
| Takanori Gomi
| Decision (unanimous)
| Shooto - Renaxis 4
| 
| align=center| 3
| align=center| 5:00
| Tokyo, Japan
| 
|-
| Win
| align=center| 7-1-3
| John Paun
| TKO (punches)
| Shooto - Renaxis 2
| 
| align=center| 2
| align=center| 2:09
| Tokyo, Japan
| 
|-
| Loss
| align=center| 6-1-3
| Takanori Gomi
| Decision (unanimous)
| Shooto - Renaxis 1
| 
| align=center| 3
| align=center| 5:00
| Tokyo, Japan
| 
|-
| Win
| align=center| 6-0-3
| Damien Riccio
| Decision (unanimous)
| Shooto - Las Grandes Viajes 4
| 
| align=center| 3
| align=center| 5:00
| Tokyo, Japan
| 
|-
| Win
| align=center| 5-0-3
| Takenori Ito
| Decision (majority)
| Shooto - Gig '98 1st
| 
| align=center| 3
| align=center| 5:00
| Tokyo, Japan
| 
|-
| Draw
| align=center| 4-0-3
| Caol Uno
| Draw
| Shooto - Reconquista 4
| 
| align=center| 2
| align=center| 5:00
| Tokyo, Japan
| 
|-
| Draw
| align=center| 4-0-2
| Hayato Sakurai
| Draw
| Shooto - Reconquista 1
| 
| align=center| 3
| align=center| 3:00
| Tokyo, Japan
| 
|-
| Win
| align=center| 4-0-1
| Naoto Kojima
| Decision (majority)
| Shooto - Free Fight Kawasaki
| 
| align=center| 3
| align=center| 3:00
| Kawasaki, Kanagawa, Japan
| 
|-
| Win
| align=center| 3-0-1
| Masakazu Kuramochi
| Decision (split)
| Shooto - Vale Tudo Junction 3
| 
| align=center| 3
| align=center| 3:00
| Tokyo, Japan
| 
|-
| Win
| align=center| 2-0-1
| Shinji Arano
| Technical Submission (armbar)
| Shooto - Vale Tudo Junction 2
| 
| align=center| 2
| align=center| 1:42
| Tokyo, Japan
| 
|-
| Win
| align=center| 1-0-1
| Yuji Fujita
| Technical Submission (armbar)
| Shooto - Vale Tudo Junction 1
| 
| align=center| 2
| align=center| 2:15
| Tokyo, Japan
| 
|-
| Draw
| align=center| 0-0-1
| Eiji Mizuno
| Draw
| Shooto - Shooto
| 
| align=center| 4
| align=center| 3:00
| Tokyo, Japan
|

See also
List of male mixed martial artists

References

External links
 
 Takuya Kuwabara at mixedmartialarts.com
 Takuya Kuwabara at fightmatrix.com

Japanese male mixed martial artists
Lightweight mixed martial artists
Mixed martial artists utilizing boxing
Mixed martial artists utilizing judo
Japanese male judoka
Living people
Year of birth missing (living people)
20th-century Japanese people